Prince George may refer to:

People

British princes
 Prince George Augustus, later George II of Great Britain (1683–1760)
 Prince George William of Great Britain (1717–1718), son of George II
 Prince George William Frederick, later George III of the United Kingdom (1738–1820)
 Prince George Augustus Frederick, later George IV of the United Kingdom (1762–1830)
 Prince George, Duke of Cambridge (1819–1904), grandson of George III
 Prince George of Cumberland, later George V of Hanover (1819–1878), grandson of George III
 Prince George Frederick Ernest Albert, later George V of the United Kingdom (1865–1936)
 Prince George, Duke of Kent (1902–1942), fourth son of George V
 Prince George of Wales (born 2013), first son of William, Prince of Wales and second in line to the British throne

Fictional
 George (Blackadder), a fictional caricature of George IV while he was Prince Regent

Other princes
George Kastrioti Skanderbeg (1405–1468), Albanian prince and national hero
George, Duke of Coimbra (1481–1550), Portuguese Infante, natural son of King John II of Portugal
George of Lencastre, 2nd Duke of Aveiro (1548–1578), Portuguese Prince
George of Lencastre, 1st Duke of Torres Novas (1594–1632), Portuguese Prince
Prince George of Denmark (1653–1708), husband of Anne of Great Britain
Prince George of Hesse-Darmstadt (1669–1705)
Prince George of Prussia (1826–1902)
George Albert, Prince of Schwarzburg-Rudolstadt (1838–1890)
Prince George of Greece and Denmark (1869–1957)
George, Crown Prince of Serbia (1887–1972)
Prince George William of Hanover (1915–2006)
Prince George Valdemar of Denmark (1920–1986), second cousin of Prince Philip, Duke of Edinburgh
Giorgi Bagration Bagrationi (born 2011), Georgian prince

Places

Canada 

Prince George, British Columbia, largest city in northern British Columbia
Prince George-Mount Robson, a provincial electoral district in British Columbia
Prince George North, a provincial electoral district in British Columbia
Prince George–Omineca, a provincial electoral district in British Columbia

South Africa 

Prince George Circuit, motorsport circuit in East London

United States 

Prince George's County, Maryland
Prince George County, Virginia
Prince George, Virginia, a census-designated place
Prince George's Plaza Station, station on the Washington Metro in Hyattsville, Maryland

Ships 
 , four Royal Navy ships
 , sister ship of SS Prince Rupert
 , successor to SS Prince George, launched in 1947.
 , a 19th-century barque
 , operated by the Hudson's Bay Company from 1834–1837, see Hudson's Bay Company vessels

Other
 Mr. PG, a mascot and monument located in Prince George, British Columbia
 Prince George (racehorse), favourite for the 1849 Grand National